Twister's Revenge! is a 1988 American action comedy film directed by Bill Rebane and released direct-to-video.

Plot

Three bumbling criminals have repeatedly tried to steal the computerized control system of Mr. Twister, a talking monster truck with a mind of its own. They make one last attempt with an M60 tank.

Cast
Dean West as Dave
Meredith Orr as Sherry
David Alan Smith as Kelly
R. Richardson Luka as Bear
Jay Gjernes as Dutch
Tena Murray as Lulu
William Dexter as Kelly's Father (credited as Bill Dexter)
J. Worthington Kratz as Kelly's Mother
Elizabeth Gray as Love Bird Singer
Angailica as Love Bird Dancer (credited as Angel Rebane)

Featured Monster Truck show in Ionia, Michigan featured the following drivers as themselves:

Rob Fuchs, driving First Blood
Mark Bendler, driving Kodiak
Jim Miller, driving Barbarian
Allen Pezo, driving Lone Eagle

Production

Twister's Revenge! was filmed in Gleason, Wisconsin at a cost of $95,000. Rebane said that "We had a strong lead actor [Dean West] for "Twister's Revenge" but the girl — the lead actress — [Meredith Orr] was very weak."

Mr. Twister was a custom-made monster truck belonging to a local man, David Staszak. Its computer control system included an AT&T PC 6300.

Release

Twister's Revenge! was released on VHS by Video First Entertainment of Chippewa Falls, Wisconsin in 1988. It was also released in West Germany, under the title Ein Supertruck auf Gangsterjagd! ("A Supertruck on a Gangster-Hunt!") and in Japan.

It was rereleased by Mill Creek Entertainment in 2006, as part of their "Drive-in Movie Classics" series.

Reviews

1000 Misspent Hours and Counting awarded the film 2½ stars, noting that Mr. Twister's onboard AI was clearly a ripoff of Knight Rider's KITT and saying that the film had a "demented mismatch between tone and subject matter. The very idea of a funny vigilante revenge film is bizarre. I hasten to emphasize that Twister’s Revenge! is not a parody of Death Wish wannabes, but rather a Death Wish wannabe that is also a comedy."

Josiah Chiappelli gave the film 3/5 on his "Hipster Holy Grail" series.

Twister's Revenge! was featured on a 2019 episode of RedLetterMedia's "Best of the Worst" series.

References

External links

1987 films
1980s crime comedy films
American exploitation films
1987 comedy films
1988 comedy films
1988 films
1980s English-language films
1980s American films